Mark Adamek (born May 2, 1982) is an American former professional ice hockey defenseman. Adamek last played professionally with the Utah Grizzlies of the ECHL.

Adamek was drafted as a youth 177th overall in the 1999 QMJHL Entry Draft by the Quebec Remparts. Adamek opted instead to attend the Lake Superior State University where he played college hockey with the Lake Superior State Lakers men's ice hockey team before turning professional with the San Diego Gulls near the end of the 2005–06 ECHL season.

References

External links

1982 births
American men's ice hockey defensemen
Grand Rapids Rockets players
Ice hockey players from California
Lake Superior State Lakers men's ice hockey players
Living people
Rochester Mustangs players
San Diego Gulls (ECHL) players
Stockton Thunder players
Utah Grizzlies (ECHL) players
Wichita Thunder players